The 1909 Cork Senior Football Championship was the 23rd staging of the Cork Senior Football Championship since its establishment by the Cork County Board in 1887. 

Lees entered the championship as the defending champions.

On 31 October 1909, Macroom won the championship following a 1-06 to 1-02 defeat of Bantry Blues in the final. This was their first championship title.

Results

Final

Championship statistics

Miscellaneous

 Macroom win their first title.
 Bantry Blues qualify for the final for the first time.

References

Cork Senior Football Championship